Big Dry Creek is a tributary that joins the South Platte River near Fort Lupton, Colorado.

The creek flows through Jefferson, Adams, and Weld counties. In Jefferson County, it flows into and out of Standley Lake. It receives treated wastewater from several municipalities, including the City and County of Broomfield, Westminster, Thornton and Northglenn.

The Big Dry Creek Watershed Association, a non-profit organization made up of individuals and representatives from local municipalities, monitors the creek's conditions.

A second creek in the Denver Metropolitan Area shares the same name. The other Big Dry Creek rises in Douglas County and joins the South Platte River in Littleton.

The Big Dry Creek Trail, a recreation trail, roughly follows the creek from Standley Lake Regional Park to Interstate 25.

See also
List of rivers of Colorado
Big Dry Creek (Littleton, Colorado)

References

External links
Big Dry Creek Watershed Association

Rivers of Jefferson County, Colorado
Rivers of Adams County, Colorado
Rivers of Weld County, Colorado
Rivers of Colorado
Tributaries of the Platte River